Armand Andre Archerd (January 13, 1922 – September 8, 2009) was an American columnist for Variety for over fifty years before retiring his "Just for Variety" column in September 2005. In November 2005, Archerd began blogging for Variety and was working on a memoir when he died.

Biography
Archerd was born in The Bronx, New York, and graduated from UCLA in 1941. He was hired by Variety to replace columnist Sheilah Graham (former girlfriend of F. Scott Fitzgerald) in 1953. His "Just for Variety" column appeared on page two of Daily Variety and swiftly became popular in Hollywood. Archerd broke countless exclusive stories, reporting from film sets, announcing pending deals, giving news of star-related hospitalizations, marriages, and births. In 1984, he was given a star on Hollywood's Walk of Fame, in front of Mann's Chinese Theater, where he had emceed dozens of movie premieres.

One of his most significant scoops was in his July 23, 1985, column, when he printed that Rock Hudson, despite denials from the actor's publicists and managers, was undergoing treatment for AIDS.

Archerd was Jewish and a strong proponent of the Simon Wiesenthal Center and Holocaust awareness. He was married to Selma Archerd, a former actress, from November 15, 1969, until his death. They had one child and lived in Westwood, Los Angeles, California.

Archerd made four appearances on the popular, long-running game show The Hollywood Squares in the 1970s. His bluffs to questions from Peter Marshall became legendary, as he was able to fool contestants into believing his (often ridiculous) answers. Some say he was even better than the accepted champion in that regard, long-time participant John Davidson. Also in that decade, Archerd and his wife Selma made appearances on the game show, Tattletales.

He made several appearances in TV series, like Burke's Law (1964), Batman (episode 39), Mannix (1967), and Marcus Welby, M.D., and films such as The Young Runaways (1968), The Outfit (1973), Won Ton Ton, the Dog Who Saved Hollywood (1976), Gable and Lombard (1976), California Suite (1978), The French Atlantic Affair (1979) and The Happy Hooker Goes Hollywood (1980).

Archerd died at Ronald Reagan UCLA Medical Center from a rare form of lung cancer (pleural mesothelioma), as a result of his exposure to asbestos in the Navy during World War II.

Filmography

References

External links

Army Archerd's blog
Excerpts of "Just for Variety" columns written for Variety
Army Archerd Interview at Archive of American Television

1922 births
2009 deaths
American columnists
Jewish American writers
United States Navy personnel of World War II
Television personalities from New York City
Deaths from mesothelioma
People from the Bronx
People from Greater Los Angeles
United States Navy officers
University of California, Los Angeles alumni
Variety (magazine) people
Deaths from cancer in California
Townsend Harris High School alumni
Burials at Hillside Memorial Park Cemetery
Journalists from New York City
20th-century American Jews
21st-century American Jews